"O Let's Do It" is the first single from American rapper Waka Flocka Flame's debut studio album, Flockaveli. The song features Lil' Capp, who is not credited on the single version.

Track listing 
Digital single

CD single

Remix single

Remixes

The official remix features Diddy, Rick Ross, & Gucci Mane. Another remix features Trae, Ludacris, Lil' Wayne, Rick Ross & Twista. Many rappers have recorded verses over the instrumental, such as Lil Wayne for his mixtape No Ceilings, Ludacris on The Conjure Mixtape: A Hustler's Spirit, Fabolous on There Is No Competition 2 (The Funeral Service), Rock City on their P.T.F.A.O. (Empire Strikes Back) mixtape (on the mixtape it was called "Let's Do That") and Young Jeezy on his mixtape 1,000 Grams Vol. 1. A Lil' Kim verse over the instrumental recently leaked to the internet, and was supposed to be part of a female remix of the song that never materialized. Another freestyle was made by rapper Brisco verbally attacking Waka Flocka.

Music video for remix 
The video for the official remix features Diddy and Rick Ross but not Gucci Mane, nor his verse due to Gucci serving a prison sentence at the time.

Chart performance 
On the week ending February 27, 2010, "O Let's Do It" debuted at No. 95 on the Billboard Hot 100 and peaked at No. 62. The song reached No. 1 on the Billboard Heat Seekers chart.

Charts

Weekly charts

Year-end charts

References

2009 songs
2009 debut singles
Waka Flocka Flame songs
Warner Records singles
Asylum Records singles